Celestino Lazala Rodriguez (May 11, 1872 – 1955) was a Filipino lawyer and politician from Cebu, Philippines. He served as member and deputy in the Philippine Assembly (1907–1912), as senator (1916–1922), member of the 1st National Assembly (1935–1938), and 1st Congress of the Commonwealth in 1945.

Early life 
Celestino Rodriguez born to parents Jose Rodriguez and Vicenta Lazala in Bogo, Cebu on May 11, 1872, coming from a wealthy Bogo family with extensive landholdings in the northern sugar-belt towns of the province. He married Ignacia La Sala and had four children. At Ateneo de Manila, he acquired a bachelor's degree in 1892 and a law degree from the La Universidad Central de Madrid in 1900.

Career 
Passing the bar and becoming a lawyer in 1902, Rodriguez practiced law as profession.

In 1904, Rodriguez first became the municipal president of Cebu. In 1907, he was elected to the Philippine Assembly as member of the 1st Philippine Legislature representing Cebu's 1st district, then was reelected for the 2nd Philippine Legislature in 1910 until 1912, and would become deputy. The Philippine Assembly was organized to pave the way for independence from the American rule. He became the first representative of the old first district of Cebu, which included the towns of Bogo, Borbon, Catmon, Danao, Pilar, Poro, San Francisco, Sogod, Tabogon, and Tudela. 

Later, Rodriguez was elected senator and served in the Fourth, Fifth, and Sixth Legislatures, from 1916 until 1925. At the time, the country was divided into 12 senatorial districts, with each district voting two senators; Rodriguez represented Cebu, which was the 10th district. 

Rodriguez was voted as a member of the 1st National Assembly, representing Cebu's first district, from 1935 to 1938. He then served in the 1st Congress of the Commonwealth after the war in 1945.

Historical commemoration 

 Named Waling Waling Street previously and located within the Capitol compound, the Don Celestino Rodriguez Street was named in his honor by virtue of City Ordinance No. 635.

References 

20th-century Filipino lawyers

Ateneo de Manila University alumni
People from Bogo, Cebu

Senators of the 4th Philippine Legislature

Senators of the 6th Philippine Legislature

1872 births
Filipino city and municipal councilors
Members of the Philippine Legislature
Senators of the 5th Philippine Legislature
Members of the National Assembly of the Philippines

1955 deaths
Year of death missing